Lytchett Matravers  is a large village and civil parish in Dorset, England. The 2011 census recorded the parish as having 1,439 households and a population of 3,424.

History
The name comes from the Brittonic litchet meaning "grey wood" and the Norman surname "Maltravers." Until the Norman Conquest of England in 1066 a Danish lord called Tholf held the manor of Lytchett. 
An alternative derivation of the name Lytchett is from the word lynchet or linchet, which is an earth terrace found on the side of a hill. Lynchets are a feature of ancient field systems of the British Isles. Such terraces were visible in Garden Wood above the Church and Manor in the 1970's. 

After the conquest William I granted the manor to Hugh Maltravers, who was still the feudal overlord when the Domesday Book of 1086 recorded Lytchett Matravers as part of Cogdean Hundred in 1086.

The Maltravers family held the village for about 300 years, until the Black Death reduced the population in the second half of the 14th century. The surviving villagers deserted the original village, sited around the church and manor house, and resettled further up the hill.

The remaining female heir to the title 'in abeyance', Eleanor Maltravers, inherited the title on the death of her sister, Joan, in or after 1376. She married John FitzAlan, 1st Baron Arundel on 17 February 1359.

The estate was later bought from the Arundels by the Trenchard family, who demolished the former manor house and built a new one that incorporated, amongst other facilities, a ballroom and a tower. When the Trenchard family foundered in 1829, the manor passed to the Dillon family who added the name Trenchard to their own. However, the newly titled Dillon-Trenchards chose not to occupy the newer manor house. The Dillon-Trenchards left Lytchett Matravers in the latter part of the 20th century.

Lytchett Matravers has developed over the 20th century from a settlement of mostly scattered cottages with large curtilages to a village with a moderately high housing density. In the 1920s and 1930s there was some ribbon development on the main access road. This continued into the 1950s with the addition of small scale infill housing behind. Since the 1970s development has mainly been through housing estates. In the 1960s and early 1970s many of the original cob and thatch cottages were either demolished or greatly altered, but there are still 13 thatched cottages in the village, some of which retain their original curtilage. Recently some modern developments have included a smattering of thatched houses in an acknowledgement of the local vernacular architecture.

Governance
There is a Lytchett Maltravers electoral ward for Dorset Council. It is larger than the parish, extending westward towards Bulbury. The 2011 Census recorded the ward's population as 3,747.

Geography
The elevation gives views from many parts of the village to Poole Harbour and the Purbeck hills. The village is in the Green Belt of the South East Dorset conurbation. To the northeast are the plantations of Henbury and Stoney Down and to the south the woods of Lytchett Heath.

The village is on what until 150 years ago was the main road between Poole and Dorchester. There is some through traffic through the village between the main A350 and A35.

Religion

The church's west tower is 13th-century, the chancel is 14th-century and the rest of the church was rebuilt in about 1500. It is a Grade I listed building. The west tower has six bells, the oldest of which was cast in about 1400.

Near the middle of the village is a Methodist church, which is a member of Poole Bay Methodist Circuit.

Amenities

Lytchett Matravers has two pubs: the Chequers Inn and the Rose and Crown.

The village has a primary school. It was enlarged and relocated in 1990 and draws pupils from outside its catchment area.

The village hall was built in 1972, to replace the ailing Victory Hall. It has views over Poole Harbour. A small parish council office is attached.

The youth centre is just off the west end of the High Street and is derelict. The village has a children's play area, recreation ground, basketball court, a skateboarding area and a scout hut for the 1st Lytchett Matravers Scouts.

The Lion Hall and more recently the British Legion have been demolished to make way for new housing estates.

Economy
A small number of businesses run in or from the village. Most of those of working age however, commute elsewhere in Dorset for their work, chiefly to Poole and Bournemouth.

Sport and recreation
There is a cricket club in the village. For children there are Beavers, Cubs, Brownies, Scouts, Guides, an Army Cadet Force Detachment and a Youth Parish Council.

Lytchett Matravers Detachment (The Rifles), Dorset Army Cadet Force, is located opposite the Chequers Inn. The current centre was opened in September 1995, and is to this day home to a successful ACF unit.

The monthly Parish Magazine includes articles on the activities of 12 clubs and societies in the village. 

For many years, the village has held a traditional carnival in June.

Twinning
The village is twinned with the French village of Les Pieux,  from Cherbourg.

References

Further reading

External links

 Lytchett Matravers Parish Council
 Lytchett Matravers Online

Civil parishes in Dorset
Villages in Dorset